Alec MacDonald (born 27 October 2001) is a New Zealand professional rugby league footballer who plays as a  for the Melbourne Storm in the NRL.

Background
MacDonald was born in Auckland, New Zealand and moved to Queensland when he was nine-years old.

He played his junior rugby league for the Easts Springwood Tigers and Ormeau Shearers, and attended Chisholm Catholic College, Cornubia.

In 2021, he played three games for the Wynnum Manly Seagulls in the 2021 Queensland Cup, while winning the club's under-21s player of the year in the 2021 Hastings Deering Colts season. He was a member of the Wynnum Manly team that won the 2021 Hasting Deering Colts Grand Final 17–16 against Townsville Blackhawks. MacDonald then received a train and trial contract with the Melbourne Storm after being scouted by former Storm player Tim Glasby.

Playing career
MacDonald signed with Melbourne on a train and trial contract ahead of the 2022 NRL season, earning a full-time contract to stay with the club for the 2022 Melbourne Storm season. He made his debut in round 1 of the 2022 NRL season for Melbourne Storm against Wests Tigers (player cap 221). While with Melbourne, MacDonald also played for Storm feeder club Brisbane Tigers, making his first appearance for the Tigers on 24 April 2022 during the 2022 Queensland Cup season.

In round 17, MacDonald scored his first NRL try, scoring a late consolation try for Melbourne against Cronulla.

References

External links
Storm profile
18th Man Profile

2001 births
Living people
New Zealand rugby league players
Melbourne Storm players
Rugby league locks
Rugby league players from Auckland
Eastern Suburbs Tigers players